Djarum Foundation is a non-profit organization from Indonesia active domestically in the areas of sport, environment, education, culture and social. President Director of the Djarum Foundation is Victor Hartono. The organization was officiated on 30 April 1986 based on informal activities of the two brothers Michael Bambang Hartono and Robert Budi Hartono (father of Victor Hartono) starting from 1951.

History 
 1951: The beginning of Djarum Foundation Social Duty in Kudus
 1969: The beginning of PB Djarum Sports Duty, when Djarum's employees started to use the Brak in Bintingan Lama as a place to play badminton in the evenings.
 1979: The beginning of Djarum Trees For Life
 1992: Alan Budi Kusuma won the gold medal for Men's Single in the Barcelona Olympics. Ardy B. Wiranata won the silver medal for Men's Single. Eddy Hartono/Rudy Gunawan won the silver medal for Men's double. This year was also the start of Djarum Apresiasi Budaya (Djarum Cultural Appreciation).
 1997: Sigit Budiarto paired with Candra Wijaya won the Badminton World Championships.
 2012: Djarum Foundation Environment Duty began the Trembesi tree plantation along 1.350 km Pantura Jawa path, starting from Merak through Banyuwangi.
 2016: Djarum Foundation Education Duty and partners built an animation studio at a vocational high school, SMK Raden Umar Said, in Kudus.  
 2017: On March 12, PB Tangkas athletes, Kevin Sanjaya Sukomuljo and Marcus Fernaldi Gideon, won the Men's Double in All England 2017 during the final that took place Barclaycard Arena, Birmingham, United Kingdom.

Five Duties of Djarum Foundation 
Djarum Foundation programs are focused into five duties, which are:

Djarum Foundation Social Duty 
Djarum Sumbangsih Sosial is the ongoing program under the Djarum Foundation Social Duty. The social activities that have been done by the Social Duty are: 
 Blood Donor: Djarum Foundation partners with the Indonesian Red Cross to do a routine blood donor once every 3 months.
 Natural Disaster Shelter: The Social Duty team responds to the natural disaster victim needs, which disasters include drought, fire, or volcano eruption. 
 Dengue Fever Prevention: The Social Duty team travels to several suburbs and organizes Aedes aegypti mosquito nest eradication program. 
 Free Cataract Surgery:  Djarum Foundation partners with the Indonesian Eye Specialists Association to organize free cataract surgery.
 Health Services Quality Improvement: Djarum Foundation partners with Yayasan Bangun Sehat Indonesiaku to provide free health check-up for those in need.
 Orphanage Quality Improvement: Djarum Foundation improves the physical quality of eight orphanages in Kudus by facilitating and renovating the premises.

Djarum Foundation Sports Duty 
Indonesia is one of the leading country within the Badminton field. Thus, Djarum Foundation is involved by providing Badminton Scholarship program, in order to massively contribute within the improvement of Indonesia Badminton achievements, with activities such as:
 PB Djarum: The badminton club was founded to flourish the country's name within the Badminton field, where it has also given birth to badminton athletes who have won numerous world class championships.
 Athletes Training Center: PB Djarum trains their athletes at their training center in Kudus.
 Djarum Badminton Scholarship: Since 2006, Djarum Foundation Sports Duty has organized several open auditions to recruit athletes under 13 and 15 year olds.
 Djarum Badminton All Stars: A few big PB Djarum athletes share their experience to fellow athletes and badminton enthusiasts to fire their sporting passion all across the country. 
 Djarum Badminton Coaching Clinic: During this activity, PB Djarum trainers share information, give motivation, and share their experience to hundreds of beginner athletes and badminton community, as well as city and district coaches.
 Mabar (Main Bareng): This community involves badminton enthusiasts from different cities to play badminton together.

Djarum Foundation Environment Duty 
One of the indicators of a country's progress and prosperity reflects on their environment. Djarum Trees For Life makes a serious effort to create a clean, comfortable, and healthy environment, to reach a prosperous living quality in Indonesia. Some of their activities are:
 Plants Nursery Center: Djarum Foundation prepared a dedicated field for plant nursery and cultivation.
 A 1.350 km-Trembesi-Plantation from Merak through Bayuwangi: From 2010 to 2015, Djarum Trees For Life has successfully planted 41,758 Trembesi trees along the path of Pantai Utara Pulau Jawa, and has been nursing the trees for three years.
 Trembesi Plantation Along Lingkar Pulau Madura: At the beginning of 2016, Djarum Trees For Life has committed to plant 20,000 Trembesi trees across the path of Lingkar Luar Pulau Madura.
 Trembesi Plantation Along Cipali Toll Road: 12,979 Trembesi trees along Cipali Toll Roads are expected to be an open green space.
 Lereng Muria Conservation: The conservation was built to balance the forest ecosystem, and to prevent natural disasters caused by deforestation. Since 2006, there have been 56,350 trees of different species planted.

Djarum Foundation Education Duty 
Besides realizing the Social Duty, Djarum Scholarship Plus was made to increase Indonesian education quality with the hope that it will also improve the people's welfare. More than 9,855 outstanding college students have received scholarship, where they are also equipped with several soft skills that will improve their education performance.
 Djarum Scholarship Plus Program:  This program is given to college students in Indonesia. The scholar will receive scholarship fund for a year, as well as various soft skills training such as Nation Building, Character Building, Leadership Development, Competition Challenges, and International exposure. The scholars came from different education backgrounds and provinces in Indonesia.
 Other Education Program: Other programs that Djarum Foundation runs are quality improvement for Elementary School, Middle School, Vocational High School, Higher Education, and Road to Campus.

Djarum Foundation Cultural Duty 
Djarum Cultural Appreciation has a mission to increase nationalism and people's appreciation towards Indonesian culture. A few examples of their programs are:
 Indonesian Culture Appreciation: Djarum Foundation has supported more than 2,000 cultural activities, and partnered with numerous artists, humanists, and art communities to channel creativity in different art streams.
 Batik Kudus Gallery: The Cultural Duty gives routine batik trainings for mothers and teens in Kudus.
 Indonesia Kaya Gallery: A public space that merges education and digital multimedia concept to introduce Indonesian culture, especially for the youth.

Program and Activities 
Routine activities run by Djarum Foundation have always been synced with their mission, which is to put Indonesia forward to prosperity. According to Djarum Foundation's five duties, the program and activities involved are also focused on social, sports, education, environment and culture.

Social Duty 
 Blood Donor: Djarum Foundation Social Duty organized blood donor events at Djarum Sport Centre in Jakarta. The event was held for Djarum's employees and affiliates, which has been done 3 times in 2016, and has successfully collected 1095 bags of blood.
 Natural Disaster Treatment: The Social Duty of Djarum Foundation partnered with the Fire and Disaster Relief Services in Jakarta, organizing a fire prevention training and socialization in Kapuk, Cengkareng, West Jakarta on October 5, 2015. Djarum Foundation also hand over some fire extinguisher tools for the particular location.
 Dengue Fever Prevention: Since February 2013, Djarum Foundation Social Duty entered Cipinang Melayu district to prevent Aedes aegypti mosquitos in the particular area through Kader Jumantik program. In December 2016, Djarum Foundation Social duty invited 90 villagers from RW 01, 02, and 03 to join the Jumantik training program.
 Free Cataract Surgery: In November 2016, Djarum Foundation partnered with St. Elisabeth Hospital in Ganjuran and Ganjuran parish, holding free cataract surgery for the people, with the total of 57 participants.
 Fishermen Health Treatment: In February 2016, hundreds of Kendal fishermen joined a free health treatment that was hosted by Djarum Foundation Social Duty, who partnered with the Naval Force Base (TNI Angkatan Laut) and Yayasan Bangun Sehat Indonesiaku Surabaya (health organization).
 Mass Circumcision: In January 2016, Djarum Foundation partnered with Yayasan Bangun Sehat Indonesiaku and Naval Force Base (TNI Angkatan Laut) in Semarang held mass circumcision for Pelabuhan Tasik Agung residents in Rembang district. 30 local children aged 9–13 year olds joined the social event.
 Orphanage Quality Improvement: In 2005, Djarum Foundation did physical improvements to eight orphanages in Kudus, by adding more facilities and renovated the premises. The orphanages were Darul Muntamah, Budi Luhur, Dzikrul Hikmah, Darussalamah, Darul Hadlonah, Nurul Jannah, Kalimosodo, and Melati.

Sports Duty 
 PB Djarum: The Badminton club expanded their search for young, talented athletes during the Open Audition for Djarum Badminton Scholarship 2017 in several different cities.

Environment Duty 
 A 1.350 km-Trembesi-Plantation from Merak through Bayuwangi: From 2010–2015, Djarum Trees For Life have successfully planted 41,758 Trembesi trees along 1,350 km path from Merak through Bayuwangi.

Education Duty

Vocational High School Programs 
 Vocational High School Improvements Program: SMK Raden Umar Said in Kudus has ‘3D Animation’ major with the help from Djarum Foundation, where the organization provided human resources and animation tools and facilities. Besides that, Djarum Foundation also supports the creation of SMK NU Banat Kudus students, which were Muslim fashion that was being presented at Indonesia Fashion Week.

Cultural Duty 
 Indonesia Menari 2016: In November 2016, Galeri Indonesia Kaya organized an event called “Indonesia Menari 2016”, inviting Indonesians to get to know their traditional dances better. As an annual event, being held for the 5th time, the event was simultaneously held in 8 indoor spots in Grand Indonesia, Jakarta.

References

Foundations based in Indonesia